The slender sheartail (Doricha enicura) is a species of hummingbird in tribe Mellisugini of subfamily Trochilinae, the "bee hummingbirds". It is found in El Salvador, Guatemala, Honduras, and Mexico.

Taxonomy and systematics

The slender sheartail shares genus Doricha with the Mexican sheartail (D. eliza). It is monotypic.

Description

Both sexes have a long, decurved, black bill and a white spot behind the eye. The male's head, upperparts, and sides of the belly are green. Its gorget is pinkish purple and the chest and center of the belly white. The very long tail is deeply forked. The central pair of feathers are green and the others blackish. The female's upperparts are green and the underparts cinnamon-buff. It has a blackish stripe through the eye. Its tail is much shorter and less forked than the male's; its central pair of feathers are green and the others cinnamon with a wide black band near the tip and white tips.

Distribution and habitat

The slender sheartail is found in mountains and their interior valleys from Chiapas in southern Mexico through Guatemala and northeastern El Salvador into Honduras. It inhabits semi-open landscapes such as forest openings, woodland, secondary forest, and scrublands.

Behavior

Movement

The slender sheartail is generally sedentary though there are seasonal changes in abundance.

Feeding

The slender sheartail forages for nectar and small arthropods from ground level to the middle strata of the vegetation. While feeding on nectar, males hold their tails nearly vertical while females wag and open and close theirs.

Breeding

The slender sheartail has been documented breeding in October in Chiapas, but nothing else is known about its breeding phenology.

Vocalization

The slender sheartail's vocalizations are poorly known and have seldom been recorded. It does make "fairly hard, rapid chips" while perched or feeding.

Status

The IUCN has assessed the slender sheartail as being of Least Concern. It has a fairly large range and an estimated population of between 20,000 and 50,000 mature individuals. However, the population is believed to be decreasing. It is considered rare to locally common. The main threat to it is clearing of its habitat for agriculture.

References

slender sheartail
Birds of Mexico
Birds of Guatemala
Birds of El Salvador
Birds of Honduras
slender sheartail
Taxa named by Louis Jean Pierre Vieillot
Taxonomy articles created by Polbot